Pneuma is an album by American violinist and composer Michael White featuring performances recorded in 1972 and released on the Impulse! label.

Reception

Allmusic reviewer Mark Allan states, "This ground-breaking jazz violinist demands much from his listeners".

Track listing
All compositions by Michael White
 "Pneuma (Part 1)" - 5:16   
 "Pneuma (Part 2)" - 4:57   
 "Pneuma (Part 3)" - 4:11   
 "Pneuma (Part 4)" - 4:13   
 "Pneuma (Part 5)" - 1:52   
 "Ebony Plaza" - 9:18   
 "Journey of the Black Star" - 2:53   
 "The Blessing Song" - 6:25

Personnel
Michael White - violin
Ed Kelly - piano
Ray Drummond - bass
Kenneth Nash - percussion
Faye Kelly, Leola Sharp, D. Jean Skinner, Joyce Walker - vocals

References

Impulse! Records albums
Michael White (violinist) albums
1972 albums